Carrizo Springs High School is a public high school located in Carrizo Springs, Texas (USA) and classified as a 4A school by the UIL.  It is part of the Carrizo Springs Independent School District that serves all students in Dimmit County .  In 2015, the school was rated "Met Standard" by the Texas Education Agency.

Athletics
The Carrizo Springs Wildcats compete in these sports - 

Cross Country, Volleyball, Football, Basketball, Powerlifting, Golf, Tennis, Track, Softball, and  Baseball

State Titles
One Act Play 
1957(B)

Alumni
John Ayers, (April 14, 1953 – October 2, 1995), National Football League offensive lineman for the San Francisco 49ers from 1977 through 1987.
Tracy King, member of the Texas House of Representatives from Batesville, Texas, formerly from Carrizo Springs

References

External links
Carrizo Springs ISD

Public high schools in Texas